The 2013 Lehigh Mountain Hawks football team represented Lehigh University in the 2013 NCAA Division I FCS football season. They were led by eighth-year head coach Andy Coen and played their home games at Goodman Stadium. They were a member of the Patriot League. They finished the season 8–3, 3–2 in Patriot League play to finish in a three-way tie for second place.

Schedule

Source: Schedule

Ranking movements

References

Lehigh
Lehigh Mountain Hawks football seasons
Lehigh Mountain Hawks football